This is a summary of 1931 in music in the United Kingdom.

Events
24 January – Mary Garden makes her last appearance with the Chicago Civic Opera company. She retires to her native Scotland.
22–28 July – The ninth annual ISCM Festival of Contemporary Music takes place in London and Oxford, with concerts of orchestral, choral, and chamber music.
date unknown – Gustav Holst appears as an extra in a crowd scene in the film The Bells.

Popular music
"Close Your Eyes", by  D. Carter and H. M. Tennent
"Lady Of Spain"; music by Tolchard Evans, lyrics by Erell Reaves
"Mad Dogs and Englishmen", by Noël Coward

Classical music: new works
Havergal Brian – Symphony No. 2 in E minor
Frank Bridge – Phantasm, for piano and orchestra
Benjamin Britten –
Christ's Nativity, Christmas Suite, for SATB choir
Plymouth Town, ballet, for orchestra
String Quartet in D
Arnold Cooke – Passacaglia, Scherzo, and Finale, for flute, oboe, clarinet, bassoon, and string quartet
Frederick Delius –
Fantastic Dance, for orchestra
Irmelin Prelude, for orchestra
George Dyson – The Canterbury Pilgrims (Geoffrey Chaucer), for soprano, tenor, baritone, choir, and orchestra
Edward Elgar – Soliloquy, for oboe and orchestra
Gerald Finzi – To Joy, for voice and piano, op. 13
Patrick Hadley – Symphonic Ballad: The Trees So High
Gustav Holst – Twelve Welsh Folk Songs, for choir, H183
Herbert Howells – 
"A Maid Peerless", for SSAA choir and orchestra 
Severn, for SATB choir
Gordon Jacob – Passacaglia on a Well-Known Theme, for orchestra
Elizabeth Maconchy –
A Hymn to Christ, A Hymn to God the Father, for double choir
The Leaden Echo and the Golden Echo, for choir and orchestra
Cyril Scott – 
Concerto, for cello and orchestra
Trio No. 1, for violin, viola, and cello
Trio No. 2, for violin, viola, and cello
Herbert Sumsion – Piano Trio
Michael Tippett – Symphonic Movement, for orchestra
Ralph Vaughan Williams – 
Job: A Masque for Dancing (ballet)
Piano Concerto in C major
William Walton – Belshazzar's Feast (oratorio)

Opera
Thomas Frederick Dunhill – Tantivy Towers, words by A. P. Herbert

Film and Incidental music
John D. H. Greenwood – Alibi

Musical theatre
8 January – Folly To Be Wise (revue) opens at the Piccadilly Theatre, starring Cicely Courtneidge.
13 October – Noël Coward's Cavalcade opens at the Theatre Royal, Drury Lane, where it runs for 405 performances.
23 December – Hold My Hand (Music: Noel Gay Lyrics: Desmond Carter Book: Stanley Lupino) opens at the Gaiety Theatre,  Starring Jessie Matthews, Sonnie Hale and Stanley Lupino.

Musical films
 A Man of Mayfair, starring Jack Buchanan
 Sally in Our Alley, starring Gracie Fields
 Sunshine Susie, starring Renate Müller and Jack Hulbert

Births
6 January – David Whitaker, composer, songwriter, arranger and conductor (died 2012)
25 March – Humphrey Burton, television music and arts presenter
29 April – Lonnie Donegan, skiffle musician (died 2002)
5 July – Aloysius Gordon, British-based Jamaican jazz pianist, singer (died 2017)
28 August – John Shirley-Quirk, operatic bass-baritone (died 2014)
12 September – Tommy Moore, drummer (died 1981)
24 September – Anthony Newley, songwriter, actor and singer (died 1999)
4 October – Anna Reynolds, operatic mezzo-soprano (died 2014)
4 November – Clinton Ford, singer (died 2009)

Deaths
8 May – Bertha Lewis, singer and actress with the D'Oyly Carte Opera Company, 43 (car accident)
18 June – Fanny Holland, singer and actress, 83
22 August – Joseph Tabrar, songwriter, 73
19 November – Frederic Cliffe, composer, 74
23 November – Leonora Braham, operatic soprano and actress, 78

See also
 1931 in British television
 1931 in the United Kingdom
 List of British films of 1931

References

British Music, 1931 in
Music
British music by year
1930s in British music